Ahal may refer to:

 Ahal Province, in Turkmenistan
 Ahel, a city in Fars Province, Iran
 FC Ahal, Turkmen football club
 Ahal, Raebareli, a village in Uttar Pradesh, India